San Lorenzo is a settlement in Santa Marta Municipality, Magdalena Department in Colombia.

Climate
San Lorenzo has a pleasant through extremely dull and foggy subtropical highland climate (Köppen Cwb) with heavy to very heavy rainfall from April to December and little rain from January to March.

References

Geography of Magdalena Department